Bidaram Krishnappa (1866–1931) was a musician and composer of Carnatic Indian music in the court of King Chamaraja Wodeyar IX (1862–1894) and King Krishna Raja Wadiyar IV (1884–1940) of the Kingdom of Mysore.

Bidaram Krishnappa was a Konkani-speaking Gowda Saraswath Brahmin and a native of Nandalike in modern Udupi district, Karnataka. When he was a boy he had a chance encounter with a rich businessman who loved music. This happened when hungry Krishnappa, who came from a poor family, was singing a devotional song (devaranama) in a local temple. Impressed with his voice, the merchant sponsored Krishnappa to train under the guidance of a musician called Ramaswamy. He later came under the influence of Tammayya and Veena Sheshanna. Bidaram Krishnappa is credited with having popularised the singing of Kannada devaranama on stage. He adapted certain concepts of Hindustani music into his Carnatic compositions. For his scholarship in music, he earned the titles "Shudda Swaracharya", "Pallavi Krishnappa" and "Gana Visharada". One of his disciples, T. Chowdiah, went on to become a music legend. Krishnappa was most famous for writing and rendering devaranama and kirtans.

Well-known disciples
Tirumakudalu Chowdiah
R. R. Keshavamurthy
Rallapalli Anantha Krishna Sharma

Places in honour
A road is named after Bidaram Krishnappa, named as Bidaram Krishnappa Street in Subbarayanakere area of Devaraja Mohalla in Mysore. There is a Temple i.e., Sri Prasanna Sitarama Mandira established by Bidaram Krishnappa himself. In this Temple, Cultural programs will be conducted during Rama Navami festival.

References

1866 births
1931 deaths
Indian male classical musicians
20th-century Indian male classical singers
People from Udupi district
19th-century Indian male classical singers
Musicians from Karnataka
Carnatic instrumentalists